The Battle of Charleston was a Confederate victory in Kanawha County, Virginia, on September13, 1862, during the American Civil War. Troops led by Major General William W. Loring defeated a Union force led by Colonel Joseph Andrew Jackson Lightburn. The battle was the second major battle in Loring's Kanawha Valley Campaign of 1862, which succeeded in driving Union forces out of the Kanawha River Valley. All points in the Kanawha River Valley were in the southwestern part of Virginia at the time of the battle, but are now part of the state of West Virginia. This battle should not be confused with other battles with similar names that occurred in Charleston, Missouri, and South Carolina's Charleston Harbor.

After a victory at Fayetteville on September10, and a pursuit downriver, Loring caught Lightburn's force at Charleston during the morning of September13. Much of the fighting became an artillery duel, especially after Lightburn brought his command to the west side of the Elk River. Once Lightburn burned a bridge across the river, it became difficult for Loring to continue his pursuit. Lightburn retreated toward the safety of Ohio, but abandoned the direct route on the James River and Kanawha Turnpike to avoid Confederate cavalry waiting for him. In what became known as "Lightburn's Retreat", he arrived at Ohio taking an indirect route—and brought over 700 wagons of supplies with him. Loring set up headquarters in Charleston.

Background
During the summer of 1862, General William W. Loring’s Department of Southwestern Virginia (Confederate States of America) made plans to move into the Kanawha Valley of western Virginia and take the city of Charleston after General Cox and the Kanawha Division left the Kanawha Valley to help the Union Army in the battles at South Mountain and Sharpsburg (Antietam), Maryland. Colonel Joseph Andrew Jackson Lightburn was left in command of the Union forces that remained that included the 4th WV INF, 8th WV INF, 9th WV INF, 13th WV INF, 2nd WV CAV, 80th Kanawha Co. Militia, 16th Ohio INF, 34th Ohio INF, 37th Ohio INF, 44th Ohio INF, 47th Ohio INF, 89th Ohio INF, 91st Ohio INF, 1st East Tennessee CAV, 49th Indiana INF and the 84th Indiana INF. 

On September 6, 1862, General Loring, with 5,000 men, left Narrows, Virginia on a march toward Charleston. They included the 22nd VA INF, 23rd Battalion VA INF, 26th Battalion VA INF, 30th Battalion VA Sharpshooters, 36th VA INF, 45th VA INF, 50th VA INF, 51st VA INF, 60th VA INF, 63rd VA INF, Bryan’s Battery, Chapman’s Battery, Lowrys Battery, Oleys Battery, Stamps Battery, 8th VA CAV, 14th VA CAV, 17th VA CAV, 36th Battalion VA CAV, Jenkins CAV and Floyd’s Scouts. The Confederate troops first encountered Union forces near Fayetteville on September 10, driving them back toward Charleston. The pursuit continued all day on September 11, with the Federals splitting their forces near Gauley Bridge on both sides of the Kanawha River, the Confederates doing the same while in hot pursuit.

Battle

Fighting began near Charleston in Kanawha County, Virginia (now West Virginia), on September 13, 1862. Confederate troops led by John McCausland pursued on the north side of the Kanawha River, while Loring, Wharton, and Williams pursued on the south side. Skirmishing began during the morning, and intensified in the afternoon. The battle was over by evening, when Loring's troops broke off the engagement at the Elk River where the Union forces had destroyed the bridge after crossing. McCausland was able to find a ford to cross the Elk River near present day Mink Shoals later in the day but was only able to get his cavalry across. The Union forces withdrew north to Ripley instead of the direct route to an Ohio River fortification at Point Pleasant, and then moved to Point Pleasant. Charleston became occupied by the Confederate forces.

Aftermath
The occupation of Charleston by the Confederates lasted six weeks, until October 28, 1862, when Loring's troops began withdrawing under the threat of 12,000 Union soldiers, including multiple West Virginia infantry, cavalry and artillery regiments, approaching from the northeast counties. The city was occupied without opposition by the Union.

Excerpt from John D. Chapla's history of the 50th Virginia Infantry:

Reaching Colonel John McCausland at Dickerson's farm, Loring ordered McCausland to take charge of Echols' Brigade -- Echols being sick -- as well as the 22nd and 36th Virginia regiments, two artillery batteries, and Major Salyer's cavalry detachment. With this force, McCausland was to cross the Kanawha and push on to Charleston. McCausland crossed the Kanawha at Montgomery's Ferry and, with Salyer's cavalry leading, began his pursuit. By the end of the day McCausland had stopped federal efforts to burn the salt furnaces and went into camp four miles from the ferry. On September 12, McCausland again pressed forward, with the federals attempting to block the roads by felling trees. Although McCausland's lead elements and sharpshooters tried to interrupt this delaying action, it appears to have been somewhat successful. McCausland at some points fell up to three hours behind the fleeing federals. He camped that night 15 miles from Charleston."

McCausland resumed his pursuit on September 13, moving through Camp Piatt (now Belle) and Maiden to the outskirts of Charleston. Making contact with Union skirmishers near the Elk River, McCausland deployed his brigade about 3 p.m., with the 23rd Virginia Battalion in front as skirmishers and the 22nd, 50th, and 63rd Virginia (left to right) deployed on line behind the skirmishers. The 36th Virginia was in reserve. McCausland pushed forward with his left moving through the town until he reached the Elk River and discovered that the federals had retreated across the river, destroying the only bridge over it. As McCausland probed during the next several hours for crossing points, he skirmished heavily with the Union forces drawn up across from him. "The firing was terrific, and the old 50th was gallantly through the yards and fields of Charleston under a galling fire of grape shot and musket balls," an anonymous officer in the regiment reported."

Although McCausland was ultimately able to get his cavalry across the Elk at a ford two miles east of Charleston, he found that ford impassable for his infantry and artillery. In the end, darkness halted the fight for the brigade about 7:30 p.m. McCausland moved his troops to eat and rest as the Union garrison began a retreat out of the town."

Notes

Footnotes

Citations

References

External links
 West Virginia History
 Official Records of the Union and Confederate Armies - Report of Major J. Floyd King
 Official Records of the Union and Confederate Armies - Report of Colonel John McCausland
 Clio tour of Civil War sites around Charleston, WV.

Charleston 1862, Battle Of
Charleston 1862, Battle Of
Kanawha County, West Virginia
Charleston 1862
1862 in the American Civil War
1862 in Virginia
September 1862 events